Marie Delattre (born 4 March 1981 in Arras) is a French sprint canoeist.

Career
Delattre has competed since the mid-2000s. Competing in three Summer Olympics, she won a bronze medal in the K-2 500 m event at Beijing in 2008 with Anne-Laure Viard.

Delattre also won two bronze medals in the K-2 500 m event at the ICF Canoe Sprint World Championships, earning them in 2005 and 2007 also with Viard.

Gallery

References 
Bio on Beijing2008.cn profile

Official website 
Sports-reference.com profile

1981 births
Canoeists at the 2004 Summer Olympics
Canoeists at the 2008 Summer Olympics
Canoeists at the 2012 Summer Olympics
French female canoeists
Living people
Olympic canoeists of France
Olympic bronze medalists for France
Olympic medalists in canoeing
ICF Canoe Sprint World Championships medalists in kayak
Medalists at the 2008 Summer Olympics
Mediterranean Games bronze medalists for France
Competitors at the 2005 Mediterranean Games
Mediterranean Games medalists in canoeing
Sportspeople from Arras